The 6th Lumières Awards ceremony, presented by the Académie des Lumières, was held on 24 January 2001. The ceremony was hosted by Frédéric Lopez. The Taste of Others won three awards including Best Film, Best Director and Best Screenplay.

Winners

See also
 26th César Awards

References

External links
 
 
 6th Lumières Awards at AlloCiné

Lumières Awards
Lumières
Lumières
Lumières Awards